Jiaozhuang Township is a township of Nanshi District, in the southeastern outskirts of Baoding, Hebei, People's Republic of China. , it has 18 villages under its administration.

See also
List of township-level divisions of Hebei

References

Township-level divisions of Hebei
Lianchi District